Sigma Sigma Omicron was a national collegiate sorority operating under that name in the United States from November 1, 1920 to 1927. It has had several successor names.

History
This sorority existed for approximately 13 years.  For more than half that time it was known as Sigma Sigma Omicron, with the name Sigma Phi Beta adopted during its final six years.  

Its primary founder was Vera Bartone Goelier, supported by other students of the junior, sophomore and freshman class.

On  the sorority changed its name to Sigma Phi Beta, in anticipation of a merger six months later with the three chapters of Phi Alpha Chi, which it effected on  after "find[ing] their interests and purposes similar...". 

Phi Alpha Chi had its origin as The Tanewah Club in 1919 at Berkeley. In 1926, the Tanewah Club adopted Greek letters, reorganizing as the Alpha chapter of Phi Alpha Chi. 

According to the  edition of The Sorority Handbook there were 10 active chapters of Sigma Phi Beta, with 1,000 members (p. 79). Baird's Archive lists 15.

Insignia and Traditions 
Pledge pin- "Crescented Norman shield divided vertically into two equal sections, one enameled in purple, the other in white, and displaying diagonally a gold sabre"
Member pin- "Pearl bordered circular shield of purple enamel, displaying sorority letters in gold, and jewelled additionally with six amethysts set at prescribed points outside a circlet of pearls" -- This description is accurate for both Sigma Sigma Omicron and Sigma Phi Beta.
Insignia- Circle, Helmet, Pyramid, Sabre, Sheaf of Wheat
Colors- Purple and White
Flower- Violets with White Rose
Jewels- Amethyst and Pearl
Publication- The Talaria (Martin, pp. 79– 80)

Chapters  
These are the chapters of Sigma Phi Beta prior to the merger with Phi Omega Pi in 1933.  Baird's reports that 15 were installed, with ten surviving to participate in the merger.  However, records list eight that definitely merged, with one more possible.  Known active chapters at the time of the merger are listed in bold, inactive chapters listed in italics.

Phi Alpha Chi chapters

References 

Martin, Ida Shaw (1931) The Sorority Handbook, 11th edition, Published by Ida Shaw Martin, Boston, Mass.
Miner, Florence Hood (1983). The History of Delta Zeta, 1902–1982. Indianapolis, Indiana.

Delta Zeta
Defunct former members of the National Panhellenic Conference
Student organizations established in 1920
1920 establishments in New York City